BR-030 is a federal highway of Brazil. The 1158 kilometre road connects Brasilia to Maraú.

References

Federal highways in Brazil